Anthony Whishaw  (born 1930) is an English artist and member of the Royal Academy. Whishaw claims no association with any particular art movement, stating instead that "each painting and work on paper makes its own separate demands". He is also a member of The London Group.

Education 
Whishaw attended Tonbridge School in Kent and went on to study at the Chelsea School of Art (1948–52) and the Royal College of Art (1952–55). At the latter, in 1955, he graduated with first class honours, and was awarded the Drawing Prize. He is also a recipient of the RCA Travelling scholarship, Abbey Minor Scholarship and Spanish Government Scholarship, where he painted Corrida.

Exhibitions 
Whishaw's first solo exhibition took place in Madrid in 1956, at the Libreria Abril.

Memberships 
In 1989 Whishaw was elected to The London Group. In 1980 he was elected Associate of the Royal Academy, and in 1989 he became a Royal Academician. He was also elected as a member of the Royal West of England Academy in 1992.

References 

Painters from London
Royal Academicians
1930 births
Living people
Alumni of the University of the Arts London